The Confederation of Health Service Employees (COHSE) was a United Kingdom trade union representing workers primarily in the National Health Service.

History
The union was founded in 1946 with the merger of the Mental Hospital and Institutional Workers Union and the Hospital and Welfare Services Union, with the aim of having one union to represent workers in the National Health Service on its formation.

In 1993, COHSE merged with two other trade unions - NUPE (the National Union of Public Employees) and NALGO (the National and Local Government Officers Association ) - to form UNISON, the largest public sector trade union in the UK.

Major COHSE campaigns
1948: Nursing Students Pay
1959: Unofficial Overtime ban
1962: Nurses Pay (Lets twist again)
1972–73: Ancillary Pay strikes (Low pay)
1974: Nurses Pay (Halsbury)
1974?: Private Patients Dispute
1979: Public Sector Pay (Winter of Discontent)
1982: NHS Staff Pay campaign (12%claim)
1988: Nurses Pay (Clinical Grading)
1989–1990: Ambulance Dispute

Election results
The union sponsored Labour Party candidates at each Parliamentary election from 1979.

Leadership

General Secretaries
1946: George Gibson
1947: Cliff Comer
1953: Jack Waite
1958: Jack Jepson
1967: Dick Akers
1969: Frank Lynch
1974: Albert Spanswick
1983: David Williams
1987: Hector MacKenzie

Presidents
1946: Claude Bartlett
1962: Ron Farmer
1965: Bob Vickerstaff
1976: Eric Wilson
1982: Sid Ambler
1987: Colin Robinson

References

External links
COHSE Blog
Catalogue of the COHSE archives, held at the Modern Records Centre, University of Warwick

 
Defunct trade unions of the United Kingdom
1946 establishments in the United Kingdom
Trade unions established in 1946
Trade unions disestablished in 1993
Trade unions based in Surrey